West Koasta Nostra is the seventh album by Samoan-American hip hop group Boo-Yaa T.R.I.B.E. It was released in 2003 via Sarinjay Entertainment, the record marked the first successful album for the group since its debut album, New Funky Nation. The album managed to make it to #85 on the Top R&B/Hip-Hop Albums and #42 on the Independent Albums. The album featured two hit singles, "Bang On" featuring Mack 10 and "911" featuring Eminem and B-Real. Other guests include Kurupt, Knoc-Turn'al, WC, Mr. Short Khop, Crooked I and Kokane. B-Real and Sen Dog made a cameo appearance on the album's single "Bang On".

Track listing

Personnel

Ted "Godfather" Devoux - main performer, executive producer
Paul "Ganxsta Ridd" Devoux - main performer
Vincent "Gawtti" Devoux - main performer
Donald "Kobra" Devoux - main performer
Danny "Monsta O" Devoux - main performer
Roscoe "Murder One" Devoux - main performer
Jayson Woy - A&R, art direction, design, executive producer
Kevin Gilliam - executive producer, producer (tracks 1–3, 5-12)
Marshall Mathers - featured artist & producer (track 4)
Dedrick D'Mon Rolison - featured artist (track 1)
Ricardo Emmanuel Brown - featured artist (track 2)
Royal Harbor - featured artist (track 3)
Louis Freese - featured artist (track 4)
JoVan Brumfield - featured artist (track 5)
Lionel Hunt - featured artist (track 6)
William Loshawn Calhoun, Jr. - featured artist (track 8)
George Veikoso - featured artist (track 10)
Dominick Wickliffe - featured artist (track 11)
Deshaun Woodard - featured artist (track 11)
Jerry B. Long Jr. - featured artist (track 11)
Ian Faith - Executive Producer, A&R
Tom Baker - mastering
Phil Roland - engineering
Davis Factor - cover art

References

2003 albums
Gangsta rap albums by American artists
Albums produced by Eminem
Boo-Yaa T.R.I.B.E. albums
Albums produced by Battlecat (producer)